Galdeberget is a mountain in Vang Municipality in Innlandet county, Norway. The mountain is surrounded by several other notable mountains including Oksedalshøi to the southwest, Snøholstinden and Høgbrothøgdi to the northwest, Slettmarkkampen and Slettmarkpiggen to the north, Langedalstinden to the northeast, and Torfinnstindene and Nørdre Kalvehølotinden to the east.

See also
List of mountains of Norway by height

References

Vang, Innlandet
Mountains of Innlandet